Muzeul Memoriei Neamului (Romanian; Museum of National Memory) is a private museum in Chișinău, Moldova, dedicated to the victims of the Soviet occupation of Bessarabia and Northern Bukovina, and commemorating anti-communist resistance in the region.

Overview 

Founded by the former political prisoner and dissident Vadim Pirogan, the museum is located on str. Costache Negruzzi no 4 and is supported by the Association of the Victims of the Communist Regime and of the War Veterans of the Romanian Army, a Moldovan NGO. 

In the 1990s, Mihai Ursache, a member in the 1940s of the resistance organization "Arcașii lui Ștefan" in occupied Bessarabia, founded a small museum in two rooms at 52 Kogălniceanu Street. The association was disbanded and its exhibits stored in the basement of the National History Museum. After 3–4 years, Vadim Pirogan, a former political prisoner condemned by the Soviets in 1941 to five years of forced labor at camps in the Irkutsk region, decided to rebuild the museum together with Nicholas Caireac in a 70 m2 room that they rented.

On June 30, 2010, the First Vlad Filat Cabinet, decided to create a separate Museum of Victims of Communism; however, such a museum has not been inaugurated.

Gallery

See also
Commission for the Study of the Communist Dictatorship in Moldova

References

External links
Muzeul Memoriei Neamului website at memoria.ro

Museums in Moldova
Private collections in Europe
Muzeul Memoriei Neamului
Military and war museums
Museums established in 2002
History museums in Moldova
Muzeul Memoriei Neamului